St. Mary of the Sorrows is a Roman Catholic parish located in Fairfax, Virginia. It is part of the Roman Catholic Diocese of Arlington Virginia. Although most of the parish's services are conducted at its primary worship center in Fairfax, the parish also celebrates several Masses each week at St. Mary's Historic Church in Fairfax Station, its original place of worship.

See also

References

External links
 Official Parish Site
 Roman Catholic Diocese of Arlington Official Site

1860 establishments in Virginia
Roman Catholic churches completed in 1860
Churches in Arlington County, Virginia
Churches in the Roman Catholic Diocese of Arlington
Our Lady of Sorrows
Colonial architecture in Virginia